Lobobunaea is a genus of moths in the family Saturniidae first described by Packard in 1901.

Species
Lobobunaea acetes (Westwood, 1849)
Lobobunaea angasana (Westwood, 1849)
Lobobunaea ansorgei (Rothschild, 1899)
Lobobunaea basquini Rougeot, 1972
Lobobunaea cadioui Bouyer, 2004
Lobobunaea dallastai Bouyer, 1984
Lobobunaea dargei Lemaire, 1971
Lobobunaea desfontainei Darge, 1998
Lobobunaea erythrotes (Karsch, 1893)
Lobobunaea falcatissima Rougeot, 1962
Lobobunaea goodii (Holland, 1893)
Lobobunaea jeanneli Rougeot, 1959
Lobobunaea kuehnei Naumann, 2008
Lobobunaea melanoneura (Rothschild, 1907)
Lobobunaea niepelti strand, 1914
Lobobunaea phaeax Jordan, 1910
Lobobunaea phaedusa (Drury, 1780)
Lobobunaea rosea (Sonthonnax, 1901)
Lobobunaea sangha Darge, 2002
Lobobunaea saturnus (Fabricius, 1793)
Lobobunaea tanganicae (Sonthonnax, 1901)
Lobobunaea turlini Lemaire, 1977
Lobobunaea vingerhoedti Bouyer, 2004

References

Saturniinae
Moth genera